Jefferson Nogueira Júnior (born 22 January 1994) is a Brazilian professional footballer who plays as a midfielder for Liga I club Petrolul Ploiești.

After starting his senior career at Figueirense in 2012, Jefferson went on to compete professionally in Turkey, Portugal and Romania, respectively.

Career

Early career / Figueirense
Born in Campinas, São Paulo, Jefferson started out in the academies of Paulínia and Grêmio, before joining Figueirense's youth setup in 2012. He made his senior debut on 2 December that year, aged 18, coming on as a second-half substitute in a 0–3 Série A away loss to Coritiba.

After a loan stint back to Paulínia, Jefferson was definitely promoted to the main squad in 2014. On 16 November 2014, he scored his first professional goal in a 1–1 draw at Atlético Mineiro.

Gaziantep
In January 2018, Jefferson moved abroad for the first time to TFF First League team Gazişehir Gaziantep. He made his debut on the 22th in a 3–0 league defeat of Samsunspor, and scored for the first time on 14 April in a 3–2 win over Altınordu.

During his second season in Turkey, Jefferson contributed with one goal from 15 appearances as the club achieved promotion to the Süper Lig. On 19 October 2019, he registered his first goal in the top division in a 1–4 away loss to Trabzonspor.

Moreirense
On 27 January 2022, Jefferson agreed to a contract until the end of the season with Portuguese club Moreirense. He scored his first goals in a 2–1 Primeira Liga win over Gil Vicente, on 8 April.

Jefferson amassed 16 appearances in all competitions, as Moreirense lost the relegation play-offs against Chaves 1–2 on aggregate.

Petrolul Ploiești
After being linked to Romanian team Universitatea Craiova in the summer of 2022, Jefferson agreed a deal for an undisclosed period with fellow Liga I club Petrolul Ploiești on 10 March 2023.

Career statistics

Club

Honours
Figueirense
Campeonato Catarinense: 2014, 2015

Fortaleza
Copa Fares Lopes runner-up: 2017

References

External links

Jefferson Júnior at playmakerstats.com (English version of ogol.com.br)

1994 births
Living people
Sportspeople from Campinas
Brazilian footballers
Association football midfielders
Campeonato Brasileiro Série A players
Campeonato Brasileiro Série C players
Süper Lig players
Primeira Liga players
Liga I players
Figueirense FC players
Paulínia Futebol Clube players
Fortaleza Esporte Clube players
Gaziantep F.K. footballers
Moreirense F.C. players
FC Petrolul Ploiești players
Brazilian expatriate sportspeople in Turkey
Brazilian expatriate sportspeople in Portugal
Brazilian expatriate sportspeople in Romania